Debeli Lug may refer to:

 Debeli Lug (Majdanpek), a village in the municipality of Majdanpek, Serbia
 Debeli Lug (Žitorađa), a village in the municipality of Žitorađa, Serbia